

Unprotected cruisers
 
  (1879) - Hulked 1896
  (1881) - Either hulked 1896 or became cadet training ship 1900 (sources differ)
  (1881) - Sunk at the Battle of Manila Bay, 1898
 
  (1887) - Sold 1907
  (1887) - Sunk at the Battle of Manila Bay, 1898
  (1887) - Scuttled 1898; salvaged by United States Navy; became 
 
  (1881) - Sunk at the Battle of Manila Bay 1898
  (1881) - Sank 1885
  (1885) - Stricken c. 1927
  (1886) - Stricken c. 1905
  (1887) - Sank 1895
  (1887) - Sunk at the Battle of Manila Bay, 1898, refloated
  (1887) - Sunk at the Battle of Manila Bay, 1898
  (1888) - Stricken c. 1905

Protected cruisers
 
  (1886) - Captured by the United States at the Battle of Manila Bay, 1898; became 
  (1886) - Captured by the United States at the Battle of Manila Bay, 1898; became 
  (1890)
 
  - Sank 1895
  (1891) - Scrapped early 1900s
  (1892)
  (1898) — Based on the French D’Entrecasteaux but larger at 422 feet long.
  (1900)

Armoured cruisers
 
  (1890) - Sunk at the Battle of Santiago de Cuba, 1898
  (1891) - Sunk at the Battle of Santiago de Cuba 1898
  (1891) - Sunk at the Battle of Santiago de Cuba, 1898
  (1895)
 Italian 
  (1897) - Sunk at the Battle of Santiago de Cuba, 1898
 
  (1896)
  (1897) - Wrecked 1905
  (1900)

Light and scout cruisers
  (ex-Republica, ex-Reina Victoria Eugenia) (1923)
 
  (1925) - Wrecked 1932
  (1924) - converted to an anti-aircraft cruiser
 
  (1928)
  (ex-Libertad, ex-Principe Alfonso) (1927)
  (1930)

Heavy cruisers
 
  (1936)
  (1936) - Sunk at the Battle of Cape Palos, 1938

Notes

Cruiser
Cruisers of Spain
Spain